"I Wanna Be Somebody" is the first single from heavy metal band W.A.S.P.'s debut album W.A.S.P.

It was ranked at #84 in VH1's 100 Greatest Hard Rock Songs. The origin of the W.A.S.P. classic "I Wanna Be Somebody" is from watching a Barney Miller episode. In the last few seasons of the show, Ron Glass, who played Detective Ron Harris, was writing a novel called "Blood on the Badge", and  his publisher had arranged for a book signing so he had gone to Miller and  got the okay for some time off.  Suddenly, as he is about to leave the office, a mugging detail comes and Captain Miller yells, "Harris, you and Dietrich go check it out!"  "But what about my book signing?"  Miller yells again.  "Now!"  Harris slams the phone down and yells, "God I Wanna Be Somebody!!!"  He did it with this sort of cry in his voice and it was really funny when he did it but then I thought about it and thought a lot of people probably feel like that and that was the origin of that song.

Track listing

Charts

References

1984 singles
W.A.S.P. songs
1984 songs
Capitol Records singles